The CCAA/Curling Canada College Curling Championships is an annual bonspiel, or curling tournament, that is scheduled to be held for college teams in the Canadian Collegiate Athletic Association (CCAA). The CCAA held a curling championship annually from 1984 to 1990, then not again until 2012. The championship is a Curling Canada-sanctioned event.

Past champions

References

External links
CCAA Home Page
CCAA Curling Home Page

Curling competitions in Canada
University and college sports in Canada